Sidi Maaouia Mosque, was a Tunisian mosque located in the north of the medina of Tunis.
It does not exist anymore.

Localization
The mosque was located in El Monastiri Street.

Etymology
It got its name from a saint, Sidi Maaouia, a cap Bon native.

History
The mosque had its own Habous for the Hadith recital during Ramadan.
Nowadays, it is replaced by a private house.

References 

Mosques in Tunis